SS Köln may refer to one of the following passenger steamers for North German Lloyd:

 , in service 1870–1895; scrapped 1895
 , lead ship her class; in service, 1899–1917; seized by the United States in 1917; served as troop transport USS Amphion (ID-1888) during World War I; scrapped 1924
 , in service 1922–1940

Ship names